The 22907/22908 Madgaon–Hapa Superfast Express is a Superfast train belonging to Western Railway zone that runs between  and  in India. It is currently being operated with 22907/22908 train numbers on a weekly basis.

Coach composition

The train has standard ICF rakes with max speed of 110 kmph. The train consists of 23 coaches:

 1 AC II Tier
 5 AC III Tier
 10 Sleeper 
 1 Pantry Car
 4 General Unreserved
 2 Seating cum Luggage Rake

Service

The 22907/Madgaon–Hapa Superfast Express has an average speed of 61 km/hr and covers 1348 km in 22 hrs 15 mins.
The 22908/Hapa–Madgaon Superfast Express has an average speed of 58 km/hr and covers 1348 km in 23 hrs 20 mins.

Schedule

Route and halts 

The important halts of the train are:

Traction

Both trains are hauled by a Vatva Loco Shed-based WDM-3A diesel locomotive from Valsad to Ahmedabad and vice versa.

Rake sharing

The train shares its rake with 19577/19578 Jamnagar Tirunelveli Express.

See also 

 Hapa railway station
 Madgaon Junction railway station
 Jamnagar Tirunelveli Express

Notes

References

External links 

 22907/Madgaon–Hapa Superfast Express India Rail Info
 22908/Hapa–Madgaon Superfast Express India Rail Info

Transport in Jamnagar
Transport in Margao
Express trains in India
Rail transport in Goa
Rail transport in Maharashtra
Rail transport in Gujarat
Railway services introduced in 2012